The 2022–23 Croatian Football League (officially SuperSport Hrvatska nogometna liga for sponsorship reasons) is the 32nd season of the Croatian top division football, the national championship for men's association football teams in Croatia, since its establishment in 1992. The season started on 15 July 2022. As the 2022 FIFA World Cup will start on 20 November, the last round before a stoppage will be held on 12–13 November. The league will resume games on 21 January.

The league is contested by 10 teams.

Teams
The following teams will compete in the 2022–23 HNL.

Changes
Varaždin (promoted after a one-year absence) was promoted from the 2021–22 Druga HNL. Hrvatski Dragovoljac (relegated after single season in the top flight) was relegated to 2022–23 Prva NL.

Stadia and locations

 1 Lokomotiva host their home matches at Stadion Kranjčevićeva. The stadium is originally the home ground of fifth-level side NK Zagreb.

Personnel and kits

Managerial changes

League table

Results
Each team plays home-and-away against every other team in the league twice, for a total of 36 matches each played.

First round

Second round

Statistics

Top scorers

References

External links
Official website 
Prva HNL at UEFA.com

2022-23
2022–23 in Croatian football
2022–23 in European association football leagues